John Francis Alexander Heath-Stubbs  (9 July 1918 – 26 December 2006) was an English poet and translator. He is known for verse influenced by classical myths, and for a long Arthurian poem, Artorius (1972).

Biography and works
Heath-Stubbs was born at Streatham, London. The family later lived in Hampstead. His parents were Francis Heath-Stubbs, a non-practising, independently wealthy solicitor, and his wife Edith Louise Sara, a concert pianist under her maiden name, Edie Marr. His boyhood was largely spent near the New Forest.

The Stubbs family were gentry from Staffordshire; Heath-Stubbs's great-great-grandfather Joseph, a younger son, married Mary, the only child of a judge named Heath, this eventually becoming part of the family name. Heath-Stubbs stated in his autobiography Hindsights (1993), "In my grandfather's day, the last of the Heaths made us Stubbses her heirs, so long as we changed our name to Heath-Stubbs." Furthermore, "according to family tradition", they were related to the pamphleteer John Stubbs, who was sentenced to the loss of his right hand by Queen Elizabeth I for his opposition to negotiations for her marriage to Francis, Duke of Anjou, and yet remained a staunch royalist. "Family pride, combining with a poised self-irony" marked Heath-Stubbs's poem Epitaph, beginning, "Mr Heath-Stubbs as you must understand/Came of a gentleman's family out of Staffordshire/Of as good blood as any in England/But he was wall-eyed and his legs too spare."

Heath-Stubbs was educated at Bembridge School on the Isle of Wight and at the age of 21 entered Queen's College, Oxford, where he read English, finding the lectures of Nevill Coghill and C. S. Lewis particularly rewarding. He became a poetry adviser to the firm of Routledge, co-editing Eight Oxford Poets in 1941, with Sidney Keyes and Michael Meyer, and helping to edit Oxford Poetry in 1942–1943.

By that time Heath-Stubbs had recognized his homosexuality, though his love for the poet and artist Philip Rawson was returned only in the form of strong friendship. Heath-Stubbs in the early 1940s reverted to regular Anglican worship.

Heath-Stubbs held the Gregory Fellowship of Poetry at Leeds University in 1952–1955, followed by professorships in Alexandria, Egypt in 1955–1958 and Ann Arbor, Michigan in 1960–1961, and teaching posts at the College of St Mark and St John in Chelsea in 1962–1972 and at Merton College, Oxford for twenty years from 1972. He lived for a time in the 1950s at Zennor in Cornwall.

Heath-Stubbs's translations include work by Sappho, Horace, Catullus, Hafiz, Verlaine and Giacomo Leopardi. He was a central figure in British poetry in the early 1950s, editing, for example, the poetry anthology Images of Tomorrow (1953) and with David Wright the Faber Book of Twentieth Century Verse. He was elected to the RSL in 1954, awarded the Queen's Gold Medal for Poetry in 1973, and appointed OBE in 1989.

Although diagnosed with glaucoma at the age of 18, a condition he inherited from his father, he was able to read with his left eye until 1961, but was completely blind from 1978. Nonetheless, he continued to write almost to the end. A documentary film about him, entitled Ibycus: A Poem by John Heath-Stubbs, was made by the Chilean director Carlos Klein in 1997.

John Heath-Stubbs died in London on 26 December 2006, aged 88.

Writing style
As a Romantic poet, Heath-Stubbs's diction was strong, yet subtle. Running through his work was a nostalgia for "classicism". He was consciously literary and his work elaborately wrought rather than spontaneous, which meant his was not the kind of poetry likely to have mass appeal. However, his devotion to the craft of poetry makes his work impressive. As Edward Lucie-Smith put it, "Few writers of his time had a deeper knowledge of the English language, or cared for it more devotedly."

Poetry collections
{{columns-list|colwidth=20em|
1942: Wounded Thammuz
1943: Beauty and the Beast
1946: The Divided Ways
1946: Poems from Giacomo Leopardi
1948: The Swarming of the Bees
1948: Jonathan Swift: A Selection of Poems
1948: Selected Poems of Alfred Lord Tennyson
1948: Percy Bysshe Shelley- Poems
1949: The Charity of the Stars
1950: The Forsaken Garden: An Anthology of Poetry 1824–1909, edited with David Wright
1950: The Darkling Plain: Romanticism in English Poetry from Darley to Yeats
1950: Mountains Beneath the Horizon (ed.) poems by William Bell
1951: Aphrodite's Garland - Five Ancient Love Poems
1953: New Poems
1953: Images of Tomorrow: an Anthology of Recent Poetry
1953: Faber Book of Twentieth Century Verse, edited with David Wright
1954: A Charm Against the Toothache
1955: Charles Williams: Writers and Their Work No. 63
1958: The Triumph of the Muse and Other Poems
1958: Helen in Egypt and Other Plays
1962: The Blue-Fly in His Head
1965: Selected Poems
1969: Cosmic Poem 
1972: Penguin Modern Poets 20, co editor
1974: Artorius: A Heroic Poem in Four Books and Eight Episodes
1978: The Watchman's Flute
1978: Anyte with Carol  Whiteside1979: Omar Khayyám, The Rubaiyat, translated with Peter Avery
1981: In The Shadows - David Gray, editor
1981: Buzz Buzz - Ten Insect Poems (Illustrated by Richard Shirley Smith)
1982: Naming the Beasts1985: The Immolation of Aleph1987: Cat's Parnassus, Hearing Eye. 
1988: Collected Poems 1942–1987, Carcanet Press
1988: Time Pieces, Hearing Eye. 
1988: A Partridge in a Pear Tree: Poems for the Twelve Days of Christmas, Hearing Eye, illustrations by Emily Johns
1989: A Ninefold Of Charms, Hearing Eye, illustrations by Emily Johns
1990: Selected Poems1992: The Parson's Cat, Hearing Eye, illustrations by Emily Johns
1993: Sweet-Apple Earth1993: Hindsights : An Autobiography1994: Chimaeras, Hearing Eye, lino etchings by Emily Johns
1996: Galileo's Salad1998: The literary essays of John Heath-Stubbs, edited by A.T. Tolley
1999: The Sound of Light2000: The Poems of Sulpicia, translator, Hearing Eye, illustrations by Emily Johns
2002: The Return of the Cranes2005: Pigs Might Fly}}

References

External links
John Heath-Stubbs Collection at the Harry Ransom Center
John Heath-Stubbs Collection at Emory University
John Heath-Stubbs Collection at the University of Manchester
Obituary, BBC News, 26 December 2006
Obituary, The Independent, 27 December 2006
Obituary, The Guardian'', 29 December 2006
National Portrait Gallery
Interview from 1989
BBC Your Paintings in partnership with the PCF, portrait of John Heath-Stubbs by Peter Edwards
Sebastian Barker - RSL
Archival material at 
"John Heath-Stubbs", Fellows Remembered, The Royal Society of Literature

1918 births
2006 deaths
20th-century English male writers
Writers from London
Deaths from lung cancer in England
Officers of the Order of the British Empire
Alumni of The Queen's College, Oxford
English blind people
People educated at Bembridge School
English male poets
20th-century English poets
Fellows of the Royal Society of Literature
English LGBT poets
20th-century LGBT people
Presidents of the Poetry Society